Elizabeth Applunius Chin, also known as Esther Applunius or Esther OIAM 3 (born 12 April 1987 in Tambunan, Sabah, Malaysia) is a Malaysian singer. Her father, Applunius Chin of Papar, is a veteran musician on Radio Televisyen Malaysia (RTM).

Career
At the age of 10, Applunius was Sabah champion in the RTM singing contest Bintang Kecil. In 2009 she reached the final of the Malaysian TV reality show One in a Million and many expected her to win. However, she gained second place after Shah Indrawan Ismail. In 2016 she won the first prize of RM39,999 in the Star Search 999 Singing Competition, an event organised by the Sabah-Labuan Motion Picture Traders and Entertainment Association (Slamptea).

Apart from her television appearances in One in a Million, Esther has entered and won many singing competitions since she started performing in 1998, including the 2005 Sugandoi Kaamatan singing contest and the 2008 PERTISA Award for the most popular singer in Sabah in the women's category.

She has also been a member of several bands, including D'Illusions, and has performed in a number of venues in Kota Kinabalu, the state capital of Sabah.

Recordings
2005 - Esther Applunius Vol. 1 (Kadazan Dusun Album)
2009 - Menggapai Mimpi (Single)
2010 - Selalu (Album)
2013 - Sipi - Sipi (Single)
2014 - Aku (Single)
2016 - 1 Dalam 2 (Single)
2017 - If only you knew
2020 - ALFIAN

One in a Million (OIAM)
In December 2008, Esther auditioned for the third season of the reality TV singing competition One in a Million on 8TV, and reached the final of the competition. The following shows her progress through the competition:

Performances and results

Anugerah Juara Carta Lagu Artis Sabah
In March 2011 she was the winner of the "Anugerah Juara Carta Lagu Artis Sabah" competition for her performance of the newly released song Selalu (Always), taken from her second album. The competition, organised by Sabah Radio Television Malaysia, encourages performers not only to sing, but also to write their own songs; the winning song Selalu is Esther's first major success in musical composition.

Anugerah Juara Carta Lagu Artis Sabah
7 March 2020. She again won the "Anugerah Juara Carta Lagu Artis Sabah" competition season 13 for her own song composition ALFIAN, she got champion, best vocal, and longest Running Song No.1 in Sabah FM, 42 Weeks

References

1987 births
Living people
21st-century Malaysian women singers
People from Sabah
Malay-language singers
One in a Million (Malaysian TV series) participants
Malaysian people of Chinese descent
Malaysian Christians